Taboo & Exile is an album by John Zorn. It is the second album to appear in Zorn's Music Romance Series following Music for Children (1998). Three of the tracks on this recording (Mayim, Zera'im, and Makkot) are from Zorn's Masada songbook.

Reception
The AllMusic review by Stacia Proefrock awarded the album 3½ stars stating "This is not a piece of classical movements; rather, it is like a film with constantly changing scenes. Before the end of the album, images are evoked of slow, metered tribal ritual, escape on an open road, cabaret, desert and dance. This is one of Zorn's most complex and beautiful pieces, showing that he is still constantly evolving as a composer."

Track listing
All compositions by John Zorn
 "In the Temple of Hadjarim" – 5:15
 "Sacrifist" – 4:52
 "Mayim" – 3:28
 "Koryojang" – 6:23
 "Bulls Eye" – 1:12
 "Zera'im" – 6:19
 "Thaalapalassi" – 10:28
 "Makkot" – 3:01
 "A Tiki for Blue" – 7:01
 "The Possessed" – 6:22
 "Oracle" – 4:31
 "Koryojang (End Credits)" – 2:26

Personnel
Cyro Baptista – percussion
Joey Baron – drums
Sim Cain – drums
Greg Cohen – contrabass
Mark Feldman – violin
Erik Friedlander – cello
Fred Frith – guitar
Miho Hatori – voice
Bill Laswell – bass
Dave Lombardo – drums
Mike Patton – voice
Robert Quine – guitar
Marc Ribot – guitar
Roberto Rodriguez – percussion
Jamie Saft – keyboards
Chris Wood – bass
John Zorn – saxophone

References

John Zorn albums
Albums produced by John Zorn
Tzadik Records albums
1999 albums